Langney Wanderers Football Club were a football club based in the Langney district of Eastbourne, East Sussex, England. They groundshared at Eastbourne Borough's Priory Lane.

History
The club was established in 2010 and joined the Lewes Sunday League. In 2012 they applied for membership of the East Sussex League, gaining entry to the Premier Division for the 2012–13 season. The club were Premier Division champions at the first attempt, winning 17 of their 18 league matches, and were promoted to Division Three of the Sussex County League.

Langney were Division Three champions the following season, but were unable to be promoted to Division Two as their ground did not have floodlights. However, after finishing third in Division Three in 2014–15 the club were promoted after planning permission was secured for floodlights.

In 2015 the Sussex County League was renamed the Southern Combination, with Division Two becoming Division One. The 2016–17 season saw Langney win the Division One Cup, beating Southwick 3–0 in the final. In the following season the club achieved promotion to the Premier Division with five games to spare.

In March 2021 the club announced they would fold due to financial issues.

Ground
The club initially played at Shinewater Lane, the former ground of Shinewater Association. Due to problems with the pitch, they played at Eastbourne United Association's Oval ground during the 2016–17 season, before moving to Eastbourne Borough's Priory Lane ground for the 2017–18 season.

Management history

Honours
Southern Combination
Division Three champions 2013–14
Division One Cup winners 2016–17
East Sussex League
Premier Division champions 2012–13

Records
Best FA Cup performance: Extra preliminary round, 2018–19
Best FA Vase performance: Second qualifying round, 2017–18

References

External links

Defunct football clubs in England
Defunct football clubs in East Sussex
Sport in Eastbourne
2010 establishments in England
Association football clubs established in 2010
2021 disestablishments in England
Association football clubs disestablished in 2021
East Sussex Football League
Southern Combination Football League